George Kenneth Giggall  (15 April 1913 – 23 September 1999) was an Anglican bishop.

Giggall was born on 15 April 1913 and educated at Manchester University. After a period of study at  St Chad's College, Durham. He was ordained deacon in 1939 and priest in 1940 and began his ministry as a curate at St Alban's Cheetwood and St Elisabeth's Reddish.

In 1945 he joined the Royal Navy as a chaplain, serving until 1968 when he became Dean of Gibraltar. In 1973 he was appointed Bishop of St Helena, a position he held until 1979. He died on 23 September 1999.

Notes

1913 births
Alumni of the University of Manchester
Royal Navy chaplains
Deans of Gibraltar
Anglican bishops of St Helena
20th-century Anglican Church of Southern Africa bishops
Officers of the Order of the British Empire
1999 deaths
World War II chaplains